Mönchengladbach Hauptbahnhof (German for Mönchengladbach main station) is a railway station in the city of Mönchengladbach in western Germany.

Overview
The station is the largest railway station in the city and, along with Rheydt Hbf, one of the two Hauptbahnhof stations in Mönchengladbach. Mönchengladbach is the only city with two stations designated as a Hauptbahnhof on its soil, due to the merger between the cities of Mönchengladbach and Rheydt in the 1970s, and the subsequent reluctance of Deutsche Bundesbahn to rename Rheydt Hauptbahnhof. Mönchengladbach Hbf also is the busiest (in terms of passengers) station in Germany to lack long-distance trains.

Railway lines calling at the station 
The station is on the following routes:
 Aachen–Mönchengladbach (KBS 485)
 Duisburg-Ruhrort–Mönchengladbach (KBS 425)
 Mönchengladbach–Düsseldorf (KBS 485, 450.8)
 Mönchengladbach–Cologne (KBS 465)

References

Hauptbahnhof
Railway stations in North Rhine-Westphalia
S8 (Rhine-Ruhr S-Bahn)
Rhine-Ruhr S-Bahn stations
Railway stations in Germany opened in 1851
1851 establishments in Prussia